Dharmanagar railway station is the main railway station in North Tripura district, as well as Tripura state also.  It is the oldest railway station in the state. It serves Dharmanagar and nearby cities of the district. The station consists of 2 platforms. The platform is not well sheltered. It lacks many facilities including water and sanitation.

Major trains 

 Agartala - Anand Vihar Terminal Tejas Rajdhani Express
 Agartala - Sir M. Visvesvaraya Terminal Humsafar Express
 Agartala - Firozpur Cantonment Tripura Sundari Express
 Agartala - Sealdah Kanchanjungha Express
 Agartala - Deoghar Weekly Express
 Agartala - Dharmanagar Passenger
 Silchar - Dharmanagar Passenger
 Agartala - Silchar Express
 Agartala - Kolkata Special Fare Express
 Agartala - Rani Kamlapati (Bhopal) Weekly Express
 Agartala - Secunderabad Superfast Special
 Agartala - Khongsang Janshatabdi Express
 Agartala - Dharmanagar DEMU Special

References

Railway stations in North Tripura district
Lumding railway division